Chilotilapia is a genus of freshwater fish in the cichlid family. It contains the sole species Chilotilapia rhoadesii, the Malawi bream, which is endemic to Lake Malawi in East Africa, where it prefers areas with muddy substrates from the shallows to quite deep waters.  Its primary food consists of Melanoides and Lanistes snails.  It can reach a length of  TL.  Though commonly called a "bream", this is due to its looks as it is quite unrelated to the breams proper, which are cypriniform fishes.  This species is also found in the aquarium trade.

References

Haplochromini
Fish of Lake Malawi
Taxa named by George Albert Boulenger
Monotypic ray-finned fish genera
Cichlid genera